Eggþér (also Eggthér, or Egdir; Old Norse: , 'Edge-Servant') is a jötunn in Norse mythology. He is the herder of the female jötunn (probably Angrboða) who lives in Járnviðr (Ironwood) and raises monstrous wolves. In the poem Völuspá, Eggþér is described as sitting on a mound and joyfully striking his harp while the red rooster Fjalarr begins to crow to herald the onset of Ragnarök.

Name 
It could have denoted a 'bearer of a sword' or 'one who is servant of the sword', perhaps 'one who provides victims for battle'.

Eggþér is cognate with the Old English personal name Ecgþéow, borne by the father of Beowulf in Old English poetry, and with the Old High German name Eggideo (or Eckideo).

According to Peter H. Salus and Paul B. Taylor, the Old Norse  ('Edge-Servant') is a descriptive agnomen derived from his function as the arouser of the jötnar and wolves to battle during Ragnarök. They argue that there is a "remote similarity" with Ecgþéow, since the latter was also known for the feuds he have brought about by his fighting. Both names could embody, in their respective tradition, the role of arousers of great battles and feuds. Andy Orchard and John Lindow contend however that a mythological parallel between the two figures is most likely a "red herring".

Attestation 
Eggþér is mentioned in the poem Völuspá (Prophecy of the Völva) as the herder of the jötunn living in Járnviðr (Ironwood) and raising "the kinfolk of Fenrir" (wolves). While the red rooster Fjalarr is heralding the onset of Ragnarök, Eggþér is portrayed as joyfully striking his harp.

Theories 
Scholar Andy Orchard notes that the scene of Ragnarök has a "curious echo" in the Icelandic Njáls saga, where the hero Gunnar is portrayed as singing joyfully within his own burial mound.

The identity of the  mentioned in the poem is unclear. According to scholars, she is probably the one described in stanza 40 of the same poem, a figure possibly identified with the jötunn Angrboða. She is said to dwell in the forest of Járnviðr (Ironwood), where she raises the offspring of the wolf Fenrir. Salus and Taylor contend that the herdsman Eggþér is not a shepherd, but rather a wolf-herder. In this view,  Eggþér is portrayed as 'joyful' or 'cheerful' in Völuspá because the "rearing of the wolves will bring about the downfall of the gods", and he is striking his harp to "arouse his charge to ferocious deeds".

Legacy 
Saturn's moon Eggther is named after him.

References

Bibliography

Jötnar
Herding